Howard G. (Peter) Sloane (born December, 1950) is an American philanthropist and the Chairman and CEO of The Heckscher Foundation for Children, a New York-based private foundation established in 1921 by German-born industrialist, financier, and philanthropist August Heckscher.
In 1997, Sloane took over the affairs of the Heckscher Foundation when its assets consisted largely of encumbered real estate which limited its ability to make meaningful gifts. He restructured and developed the Foundation into a significant funder of innovative education, job training, recreation, and the arts programs with assets of over $300 million. Under Sloane's leadership, the modern day Foundation underwrites projects with potential for catalytic impact when combined with public funds or other donors, and operates its own strategic philanthropy programs to promote the welfare of children and youth in New York City.

Early life 

Sloane was born in California and grew up in New York. He attended the University of Glasgow in 1970-1971, completed his undergraduate degree at Ohio Wesleyan University in 1972 and graduated from Suffolk University Law School in 1976 after a year spent at NYU Law School.

He is the maternal grandson of Arthur and Ruth (Shear) Smadbeck, who, as fellow philanthropists and friends of August Heckscher, ran the Heckscher Foundation after the Great Depression of the 1930s, which resulted in the deterioration of the Foundation's assets to the point of near collapse. Arthur Smadbeck was a real estate developer who was a president of the New York Coliseum, which was built from 1954 to 1956 by the Triborough Bridge and Tunnel Authority under city planner Robert Moses, who was a friend of Smadbeck. The complex was demolished in 2000 to make way for the Time Warner Center. Smadbeck and his brother Warren were known as "The Henry Fords of Real Estate"  because of their style of making vacation land and home ownership possible for the average person, and for their ownership of Havana, Cuba hotel properties during the Fulgencio Batista era, including the Hotel Presidente. The Smadbeck brothers were participants in development of Putnam Lake, New York, Fire Island Pines, New York and Lake Caramel, New York.

Sloane drew early philanthropic inspiration from Ruth Smadbeck who began as a volunteer in the 1930s and ran the Heckscher Foundation for over 50 years, managing its programs of dance, orchestra, exercise, swimming, the purchase and distribution of necessities for indigent children, a kindergarten, a theater, a craft room, a senior lounge, a photography group, a library, and a thrift shop. The Communications and Learning Center at Marymount Manhattan College is named for Ruth Smadbeck  which conferred an honorary degree on her in 1983.
In 1971, Sloane worked at the Shaker Mountain School, one of the first alternative schools which was founded by Jerry Mintz,  a well-known voice in the alternative school movement and Editor-in-Chief for The Handbook of Alternative Education and the Almanac of Education Choices.

Innovations in education and philanthropy 

Sloane was a founding Trustee of several pioneering New York-based non profits dedicated to education, including: Take the Field Inc. In 2000, Sloane, Anthony Kiser of The William and Mary Greve Foundation, and Richard Kahan, founder of The Urban Assembly and former President and CEO of the New York State Urban Development Corporation, conceived of and founded Take the Field, a nonprofit organization that in four years rebuilt 43 public school outdoor athletic facilities in all five boroughs at a cost of more than $132 million. The John Dewey High School athletic facilities were renovated as part of this project and are named for the Heckscher Foundation.

Sloane served as Trustee and member of the Executive Committee of Leadership for a Diverse America, an organization committed to nurturing the leadership potential of exceptional students from diverse backgrounds by increasing admission of underrepresented youth to the country's leading colleges and universities; a founding Director  of the Sisulu Victory Academy from its formation as an alternative public school in Upper Manhattan, which was the first public school in New York to be accredited as a "Charter School"; Trustee of the Maria I. New Children's Hormone Foundation, which is dedicated to researching and finding cures for children's hereditary diseases.

In 2008, Sloane and Elizabeth Mason, co-founder of Single Stop USA, a program launched by the Robin Hood Foundation to connect the working poor in New York with government funds and services intended for them, designed the first Single Stop USA/Community College Initiative to expand opportunities for youth to earn college degrees by connecting them to the government funds and services for which they are eligible. A model program was implemented at Kingsborough Community College to help low-income, high-need students draw down untapped benefits such as food stamps, health care, child care and tax credits – because access to basic resources increases the likelihood that a young person will be able to stay in college and obtain a degree, leading to higher earning potential.  The program cut in half the drop-out rate at Kingsborough.  SingleStop is now operational at community college sites in seven states and has system-wide partnerships with several of the nation's largest community college systems – the City University of New York, Miami Dade College and the City College of San Francisco.

In 2008-2009 Sloane taught a weekly course on Practical Law to inner city 9th grade students at a public high school using a curriculum he developed that is designed to demystify the law by allowing young people to better understand and thereby develop a more positive attitude toward the law.  The program has been adopted by associates at the law firm where Sloane is a partner, and is taught at Urban Assembly Schools around the five boroughs of New York City.
For several years, Sloane led the development of the Harvard College Parents Fund, for which he received the Albert H. Gordon ’23 Award.

Publications

Personal 

Sloane is the nephew of the late Justine Priestly (Smadbeck), who was the only white reporter and columnist  for the largest African American newspaper, The New York Amsterdam News, writing throughout the Civil Rights Movement under the byline of Gertrude Wilson.  In her column, White on White, Priestly wrote fervently about the most notable events of the 1960s with her unique perspective as a white, Park Avenue mother and recounted the historic events she covered in her memoir, entitled You Can't Get There From Here and Dispatches of the 1960s From a White Writer in a Black World.

Sloane's late uncle Louis Smadbeck was a philanthropist and pioneering real estate executive in Manhattan and in whose name the Real Estate Board of New York annually awards the Louis Smadbeck Broker Recognition Award.
Sloane is married to the former Jaar-mel Sevin, a New York City real estate executive. They reside in Manhattan and have three adult children.

Legal career 

Sloane is a retired partner at Cahill Gordon & Reindel which he joined in 1977 after clerking for the Honorable Thomas C. Platt on the U.S. District Court for the Eastern District of New York.

From 2004 until his retirement, he served as co-chair of the firm's pro bono committee. Sloane's law practice was focused in litigation. He litigated cases focused on open space and historic preservation.  He represented the Municipal Art Society in its fight to preserve from the wrecking ball St Bartholemew's Church, for which he was honored by Jacqueline Kennedy Onassis, and The Church of Saint Paul and Saint Andrew. As pro bono partner, Sloane established a partnership with the Legal Aid Society of New York.

References

External links 
 The Heckscher Foundation for Children Website

1950 births
Living people
American chief executives
American philanthropists
New York (state) lawyers
Ohio Wesleyan University alumni
Suffolk University Law School alumni
People associated with Cahill Gordon & Reindel